Giordana Grossi is a cognitive neuroscientist and professor of psychology at SUNY New Paltz, New York, and a member of The NeuroGenderings Network, a group which promotes "neurofeminism".

Education 
Giordana Grossi received her Ph.D. from the University of Pavia, Italy, and her B.A. from the University of Padova, Italy.

Research 
Her main areas of research are language and sex differences research, in particular the methodological and epistemological problems within sex differences research.

Publications 
Book chapters
 Grossi, Giordana; Fine, Cordelia (2014), "The role of fetal testosterone in the development of “the essential difference” between the sexes: Some essential issues", in  Pdf.

Journal articles
  Pdf.

See also 
 Cognitive neuroscience
 Gender essentialism
 Neuroscience of sex differences
 List of cognitive neuroscientists
 List of developmental psychologists

References

External links 
 

Italian cognitive neuroscientists
Developmental psychologists
Feminist philosophers
Living people
State University of New York at New Paltz faculty
Italian women neuroscientists
Year of birth missing (living people)